Martine de Bertereau, also known as Baroness de Beausoleil, (c. 1600 – after 1642) was the first recorded female mineralogist  as well as mining engineer along with her husband, Jean de Chastelet. She traveled extensively throughout Europe in search of mineral deposits and fresh ground water under the employment of various nobles and royals. During the reign of the French King, Luis XIII, Martine and her husband surveyed the sites of potential mines in France. During one of their mining expeditions Martine and her family were accused of witchcraft and fled to Hungary. Later, Martine, her husband and oldest daughter were arrested and eventually died in prison sometime after 1642. During her life, she produced multiple pieces of literature derived largely from the Roman engineer Vitruvius's book on architecture, De architectura. Her writings describe the use of divining-rods, similar to dowsing, as well as other renowned scientific ideas. Martine de Bertereau was not forthcoming about her use of different scientific ideas, and preferred the public to believe she was using magic, or renowned ancient scientific ideas. Her success came from her development in the understanding of the geologic world around her. It is uncertain of her reasoning behind the decision to lie about her actual means of success. Her literature provides a unique glimpse into the craft and skills required to mine in the seventeenth century.

Life
Martine Bertereau came from a noble French mining family in the Touraine. In 1610 she married Jean de Chastelet, Baron de Beausoleil et d'Auffenbach who was a mining expert. They had multiple children. Their eldest daughter, who died in prison with her mother, and their eldest-son son Hercule, which translates to Hercules, are the only two with information available. From 1610 until 1626 they spent their time abroad. During their time abroad they crossed the Atlantic to Potosi, Bolivia to visit mines.

The Holy Roman Emperor, Rudolph, made Jean the commissioner general of the mines of Hungary. In this capacity they traveled widely visiting mines Across Europe, and possibly South America for 16 years in search of rich ore deposits. In 1626 they were summoned back to France to begin work on restoring the French mining industry. In 1627, Hercule fell ill of "flaming heat in the intestines" and recovered after a few weeks in the Town of Chateau Thierry. During this time, Martine discovered a natural spring and claimed it had healing powers. She informed the local doctor and was proven right. The town became an attraction in which the ailed and wealthy visited. Today, geological historian Martina Kölbl-Ebert has proven this to be a long lived form of scientific fraud. The reasoning behind trying to convince people of their mystic abilities and apparent luck is unknown, although it might have been a method in which they believed richer clientele would be more interested. While they were in Chateau Thierry, the local doctor was suspicious of her reasoning, and did not believe she found the spring through the use of a diving rod. Divining rods, also known as water witching were believed to help one locate water underground. They are two metal rods bent, and held by the user. There is little scientific proof behind the method, and it has been deemed a medieval scientific idea, such as a Ouija board, and is controlled by the user. Instead, the doctor was able to discern that she found the mineral rich water through following the red iron rich deposits in the cobble stone to a water source. This realization by the doctor started the eventual breakdown of their careers. After this event, people became suspicious of their methods and their activity aroused suspicion in the provincial clergy. While at the mining base in Morlaix in Brittany that the couple developed, a priest, the Prevot Provincial named, Touche-Grippé had a bailiff search their châteaux looking for incriminating material. Upon finding their research, charts, and other materials the clergy deemed that their methods involved magic, and accused Martine and her husband of witchcraft. No charges were made but the couple were forced to leave France and fled to Germany from 1628-1629 and then Hungary. After being unable to cut their losses, they returned to France.

Once they returned to France, she wrote to Luis the XII in hopes for permission to excavate the mines she had found before fleeing. In her letter, she proposed a business model in which they could find more precious materials. In her writing she talked of using mysterious methods that both her and her husband in actuality didn't employ. The bogus methods discussed, once removed from her proposal, left the document with a reasonably sound methodology for looking for mineral deposits.  After no response from the King, Martine wrote to the king's secretary Richelieu and again did not receive a reply. Two years after her letter to Richelieu, she was arrested along with her husband and eldest daughter. Martine was imprisoned at the Chateau de Vincennes, while the Baron was sent to the Bastille, and their daughter in Vincennes. They were arrested for palm reading, horoscopy, and astrology. Although they had not participated in these activities, they still died in jail. Despite the tale Martine and the Baron had perpetuated, they did not take part in anything mythical, but just had a good grasp on basic chemistry, early knowledge in the interpreting of rocks, and the land around them. They convinced the people that they were partaking in mythological activities, while really only practicing science.

The exact date of death is unknown, although Martine and her eldest daughter died in prison sometime after 1642.

Works 

The baroness wrote two reports on her work with her husband. The first, titled Véritable déclaration de la découverte des mines et minières was published in 1632 and listed 150 French mines the couple had discovered. The first publication also describes mineral deposits in France as well as the somewhat ‘esoteric’ use of dowsing rods to locate water. This document also contains many practical and scientific considerations that allow us to understand the state-of-the-art hydrogeology of the 17th Century.

The second was in the form of poetry, addressed to Cardinal de Richelieu La restitution de pluton, (1640) which truly is a plea for the couple, more specifically for Martine to be paid for the work they undertook for the king.

In it she seeks to defend her unusual position as a woman in the mining industry.

 "But how about what is said by others about a woman who undertakes to dig holes in and pierce mountains: this is too bold, and surpasses the forces and industry of this sex, and perhaps, there is more empty words and vanity in such promises (vices for which flighty persons are often remarked) than the appearance of truth. I would refer this disbeliever, and all those who arm themselves with such and other like arguments, to profane histories, where they will find that, in the past, there have been women who were not only bellicose and skilled in arms, but even more, expert in arts and speculative sciences, professed so much by the Greeks as by the Romans.”

References

Bibliography
Wonderful history in modern times, Louis Figuier, Hachette, Paris, 1860
The Veterans mineralogists of the kingdom of France, Nicolas Godet, Ruault, Paris, 1779
Biography universal ancient and modern, Michaud, Paris, 1843

Year of birth uncertain
1642 deaths
French geologists
French mineralogists
French baronesses
17th-century French businesspeople
17th-century women scientists